Mike Askea (born January 7, 1951) is a former American football tackle. He played for the Denver Broncos in 1973.

References

1951 births
Living people
People from Steele County, Minnesota
Players of American football from Minnesota
American football tackles
Stanford Cardinal football players
Denver Broncos players
Portland Storm players
Portland Thunder (WFL) players